Winka Dubbeldam (born 1966) is a Dutch-American architect and academic. After her education in architectural design at Columbia University, she established her own firm, Archi-Tectonics (with 15 employees), in 1994 in New York City. Her use of a combination of sustainable materials, innovative and inventive building methods with adoption of digital techniques has rewarded her with many accolades for her architectural projects. She has earned a reputation as a leading figure in modern architectural designs which has also made her "a real estate newsmaker". She  is a  Professor and Chair of architecture at the University of Pennsylvania. She is also the RIBA External  Examiner for the Bartlett UCL London [2018-2022], the Creative Director for the Venice Biennale  Virtual Italian Pavillion [2021]. Her Ted talk “Crowdfunding Urban Planning” was in TED Global in Edinburgh Scotland 2013.

Her debut venture in building design was a residential house whose exhibits were displayed at the Museum of Modern Art (MoMA), and Esquire magazine named her "Best and Brightest" in 2004. Her designs have also been exhibited in the Venice Biennale, MoMa, Storefront, and  Aedes Berlin  in 2019, among others

Biography
Dubbeldam was born in 1966 in the Netherlands. Her father headed a Dutch organization connected with police and fire services. After her initial schooling in the Netherlands, she studied architecture at the Institute of Higher Professional Architectural Education, Rotterdam, in 1990 and obtained a Master of Architecture degree. She then moved to New York in 1990 to study architecture at the Columbia University where the digital revolution in architecture was in a nascent state of evolution. She obtained her Master of Architecture in advanced architectural design from this university in 1992. From 1992 to 1994 she worked with Peter Eisenman on projects which she termed as "investigations". She then established her own firm in New York, Archi-Tectonics, in 1994 and since then has been engaged in designing commercial and residential projects.

Projects
Her firm won the "Design Competition for a Sustainable Neighborhood and Farmers Market" on Staten Island, New York.

Another interesting project Dubbeldam designed is for the National Building Museum's 2004 exhibition on the theme of masonry variations. For this project she adopted materials like bricks, lightweight concrete blocks, stone and terrazo for the structural components. The exhibit was created by her, like the other three architects who were also assigned this task. She created a "fluid concrete gorge", like the Buckskin Gulch at Utah's Paria canyon. She adopted advanced digital analysis for the chamber in which it was built and the concrete was evolved with a fourth dimension by hanging speakers above the irregular shape of concrete which panned the surfaces. The "scrambled sound waves reorganized as they hit any surface and thus emitted unusual pulses that bounced off and around the shapes, converting the entire assembly into an extraordinary, almost theatrical phantasmagorical sound garden".

Awards

2022 AIA Award for the 512GW Townhouse and Climate Skin

2021 First Prize in the 9th “Longtu Cup” National BIM Contest by the China Graphics  Society for the Asian Games 2022 Masterplan and Buildings

2021 DEZEEN - TWENTY-TWO WOMEN ARCHITECTS AND DESIGNERS YOU SHOULD KNOW

2021 ARCHITIZER - 100 WOMEN TO WATCH IN ARCHITECTURE

2020 ARCHITIZER A+ AWARD – For the Asian Games 2022, masterplan & stadiums //  Popular Vote

Rethinking The Future Award 2020: Awardee for “Housing Over 5 Floors (Built)” focused on innovation and sustainability for 512GW Townhouse in SoHo, NYC

2019 PLAN Magazine Italy: Award for Masterplan “Sports and Leisure” for Asian Games  2022 Sports Park, and stadiums in Hangzhou, China

2006 IIDA / Metropolis Smart Environments Award

2001 "Emerging Voice" Award

Publications
Dubbeldam's published monographs are the Winka Dubbeldam, Architect published by 010 Publishers, Rotterdam in 1996, and the AT-INdex published by Princeton Press, New York in 2006. These have been republished in many international journals.
“Strange Objects, New Solids and Massive Things” with Actar Publishers, Spain, design WSDIA,  edited by Original Copy, Published in 2021.

Professional services
- On Editorial Board PLAN Magazine

- External Examiner RIBA for Bartlett UCL London

- Creative Director for the 17th Venice Architecture Biennale 2021: for City X at the Virtual  Italian Pavilion

Exhibitions
Dubbeldam has participated in exclusive exhibitions in Form Zero Gallery in Los Angeles  during 1994, in the Kunsthal in Rotterdam in 1996, in the Frederieke Taylor Gallery under the title "From HardWare to SoftForm" in Chelsea, New York in 2002, and the Art & Idea Gallery in Mexico City during 2004. Her firm participated in the exhibitions of the Museum of Modern Art such as "The Unprivate House" in 1999 and the "Young Architects" in 2001, and the "Max Protetch Exhibit" for a project of the World Trade Center in 2001, which was part of the Venice Biennale in 2002. Archi-tectonics also took part in the Venice Biennale "Arsenale exhibit" during 2004. She was the curator of The Progressive Architecture Network (PAN), which was exhibited in the Taylor Gallery during October–November 2006.
More recently she worked on other exhibitions such as: Never Built New York: Featured Archi‐Tectonics’ SoHo Hotel Project in 2017 at the Queens Museum, PLAN Gallery in Milan, Italy: The Architect Series – Solo Exhibit in 2018, AEDES Berlin, Solo exhibit Archi‐Tectonics: Flatlands and Massive Things in Aedes Berlin Germany in 2019.

References

Bibliography

Dubbeldam, Winka. “Text Message.” Metropolis Volume, no. 30 (Feb 2011): p 84.
Raskin, Laura. “Winka Dubbeldam.” Architectural Review, no. 201 (Oct 2013): p 24.

Living people
1966 births
American women architects
20th-century American architects
21st-century American architects
Dutch emigrants to the United States
University of Pennsylvania faculty
Columbia Graduate School of Architecture, Planning and Preservation alumni
20th-century American women
American women academics
21st-century American women
American women curators
American curators
Dutch women curators